Davis is an unincorporated community in Lincoln County, in the U.S. state of Missouri.

History
A post office called Davis was established in 1882, and remained in operation until 1959. The identity of the namesake of Davis has been lost to history.

References

Unincorporated communities in Lincoln County, Missouri
Unincorporated communities in Missouri